Bouteloua hirsuta, commonly known as hairy grama, is a perennial short prairie grass that is native throughout much of North America, including the Great Plains and Canadian Prairies region, as well as Mexico and Guatemala.

Description
B. hirsuta is a warm-season grass growing 10–20 in (0.2-0.5 m tall, and grows well on mountainous plateaus, rocky slopes, and sandy plains. The leaf blade is flat or slightly rolled, narrow, mostly basal, with hairy margins. The leaf sheath is rounded, smooth, and shorter than internodes. The seedhead is one to four spikes, purplish before maturity, about 1 in (2.5 cm) long; the rachis extends beyond spikelets. It is used primarily for grazing.

Distribution

References

External links
 
 
 
 Beetle, A. A. 1970. Recommended plant names. Univ. Wyoming Agr. Exp. Sta. Res. J. 31.
 Cronquist, A. et al. 1972–. Intermountain flora.
 Davidse, G. et al., eds. 1994. Flora mesoamericana.
 FNA Editorial Committee. 1993–. Flora of North America.
 Gould, F. W. 1979. The genus Bouteloua (Poaceae). Ann. Missouri Bot. Gard. 66:394.
 Herrera A., Y. et al. 2004. Revisión de Bouteloua Lag. (Poaceae).
 Kartesz, J. T. 1994. A synonymized checklist of the vascular flora of the United States, Canada, and Greenland.
 Mejía-Saulés, M. T. & P. Dávila A. 1992. Gramíneas Útiles de México. Cuad. Inst. Biol. 16.

hirsuta
Grasses of North America
Warm-season grasses of North America
Grasses of Canada
Grasses of Mexico
Grasses of the United States
Native grasses of the Great Plains region
Flora of the United States
Flora of the Canadian Prairies
Flora of Western Canada
Native grasses of Nebraska
Native grasses of Oklahoma
Native grasses of Texas
Flora of Mexico
Flora of Guatemala
Flora of the Chihuahuan Desert
Flora of the Mexican Plateau
Flora without expected TNC conservation status